Mohammad Siddiq (born 20 March 1979) is a Pakistani first-class cricketer who played for Abbottabad cricket team.

References

External links
 

1979 births
Living people
Pakistani cricketers
Abbottabad cricketers
Cricketers from Peshawar
Peshawar cricketers